Alberto Boullosa (born 1925) was a Uruguayan boxer. He competed in the men's lightweight event at the 1948 Summer Olympics.

References

External links
 

1925 births
Possibly living people
Uruguayan male boxers
Olympic boxers of Uruguay
Boxers at the 1948 Summer Olympics
Place of birth missing
Lightweight boxers